IDP  may refer to:

Organizations
 IDP Education, an educational organization based in Australia
 Independent Democratic Party (disambiguation)
 Interac Direct Payment, Canada's national debit card service
 International Dunhuang Project
 Intern Development Program, a training program for interns in the architecture profession 
 Iowa Democratic Party, affiliate of United States Democratic Party in Iowa
 Islamic Dawa Party (Iraq)
 Islamic Democratic Party (Maldives)
 Islamic Democratic Party (Rwanda)
 Democratic and Progressive Italy, an electoral alliance in Italy

Technology
 Identity provider (IdP), the source for validating user identity in a federated identity system
 Initial Detection Point (telephony)
 Internal DisplayPort (iDP)
 Intelligent Document Processing
 International Dialing Prefix
 Intrusion Detection and Prevention Systems
 Internet Datagram Protocol, a network layer protocol used in Xerox Network Systems

Other uses
 Independence (Amtrak station) code for Independence, Missouri, United States
 Individual defensive players, a fantasy football format
 Individual development plan, a human resources term
 Internally displaced person
 Intrinsically disordered proteins
 International Driving Permit

See also
 IPD (disambiguation)